Ampleon is a global semiconductor manufacturer headquartered in Nijmegen (Gelderland), Netherlands and founded on December 7, 2015, spun off from the NXP Semiconductors in May 2015, following the acquisition of the NXP Semiconductors RF Power business by the Jianguang Asset Management Co., Ltd. for US$1.8 billion.

References

External links 

Semiconductor companies of the Netherlands
Semiconductor device fabrication
Government-owned companies of China
Companies based in Gelderland
Nijmegen